Pumpellyite is a group of closely related sorosilicate minerals: 
pumpellyite-(Mg): 
pumpellyite-(Fe2+): 
pumpellyite-(Fe3+): 
pumpellyite-(Mn2+): 
pumpellyite-(Al): 

Pumpellyite crystallizes in the monoclinic-prismatic crystal system. It typically occurs as blue-green to olive green fibrous to lamellar masses. It is translucent and glassy with a Mohs hardness of 5.5 and a specific gravity of 3.2. It has refractive indices of nα=1.674–1.748, nβ=1.675–1.754 and nγ=1.688–1.764.

Pumpellyite occurs as amygdaloidal and fracture fillings in basaltic and gabbroic rocks in metamorphic terranes. It is an indicator mineral of the prehnite-pumpellyite metamorphic facies. It is associated with chlorite, epidote, quartz, calcite and prehnite. 

It was first described in 1925 for occurrences in the Calumet mine, Houghton Co., Keweenaw Peninisula, Michigan and named for United States geologist, Raphael Pumpelly (1837–1923).

See also
Chlorastrolite
Dallasite

References

Webmineral data
American Mineralogist, 1925

Sorosilicates
Monoclinic minerals
Minerals in space group 12